Mohamed Abdelrahman Yousif Yagoub (born 10 July 1993), also known as Al Gharbal, is a Sudanese professional footballer who plays as a forward for Sudanese club Al-Hilal Omdurman and the Sudan national team.

Club career 
On 21 November 2018, Abdelrahman scored after 22 seconds for Al-Merrikh against Algerian side USM Alger, becoming the fastest goalscorer of the Arab Club Champions Cup.

In November 2020, Abdelrahman made history by signing from Algerian side CA Bordj Bou Arréridj to Sudanese side Al-Hilal Omdurman for a Sudanese-record $USD 1 million.

International career 
Abdelrahman was included in Sudan's squad for the 2021 Africa Cup of Nations.

Career statistics

International 

Scores and results list Sudan's goal tally first, score column indicates score after each Abdelrahman goal.

References

External links
 
 

1993 births
Living people
People from Omdurman
Sudanese footballers
Association football forwards
Al-Hilal Club (Omdurman) players
Al-Merrikh SC players
CA Bordj Bou Arréridj players
Sudan Premier League players
Algerian Ligue Professionnelle 1 players
Sudan international footballers
2021 Africa Cup of Nations players
Sudanese expatriate footballers
Sudanese expatriate sportspeople in Algeria
Expatriate footballers in Algeria
Sudan A' international footballers
2022 African Nations Championship players